Mong Maoe Township (Wa: mēng hmae;), locally known as Moeknu (Wa: Mōuig Nū), is a township of Hopang District of Shan State. Prior to 2011, it belonged to Lashio District. Its principal town is Mongmao.

History
Its population before 1995 was 77,378 and Wa people were 59,105 out of them.

Ministers, Ambassadors and UN Resident representatives made a tour in January 2004 and they were told in a presentation that there was no poppy fields in Wa area including Mongmao. Rubber, orange, lychee and tea are grown as poppy substitute.

Mongmao Constituency for People Assembly was canceled in General Election 2010. Paung Nap from Wa Democratic Party is elected for National Assembly seat allocated for Hopang, Mongmao, Pangwaun, Namphan, Matman and Pangsang Township.

References

Townships of Shan State
Wa people